Hotel Shanker in Kathmandu is a historic luxury heritage hotel opened in 1964 in a building dating to 1894. It is located in Lazimpat, next to the historic Narayanhity Palace Museum. The architectural style of the building is neoclassical. This palace was  made for General Jit Shumsher Rana, (Southern Commanding General of the Army). The hotel is characterised by exquisite and authentic objects d'art. For example, the carved windows displayed in the lobby bar are over 200 years old.

This hotel is now a reputed address in Kathmandu, Nepal. Online booking at the official site was started for tourists since 2004. The hotel won the Trip Advisor Travelers' choice awards for the years 2013 and 2014 in the top hotels category.

Background and history

At the turn of the 19th century, Gen. Jit Shumsher Rana, brother of HH Sri Tin Maharaja Bhir Shumsher Jung Bahadur Rana, hired architect Kumar Narsingh Rana to build this palace. The exteriors were fashioned in neoclassical style and the interiors were done as per European tastes of the time. The construction was completed in 1894 A.D.

Gen. Jit Shumsher, who suffered from an acute illness, died prematurely July 29, 1913, and this palace eventually came into the possession of Gen. Maharajkumar Agni Shumsher Jung Bahadur Rana - the son of  HH Sri Tin Maharaja Juddha Shumsher Jung Bahadur Rana, one of the most distinguished of the powerful Rana Maharajas. Agni Shumsher's granddaughters Queen Aishwarya, Queen Komal, and Princess Prekshya were born in the palace.

In 1964 Ram Shanker Shrestha took the palace, which was then known as Agni Bhawan, on lease, converting into a hotel while maintaining the exterior.

Gallery

References

External links 
Official Web Site
Official Facebook
Official Twitter
Google Maps

Hotels in Kathmandu
Hotels established in 1964
Hotel buildings completed in 1894
Heritage hotels
Former palaces in Nepal
Neoclassical architecture
Hotels in Nepal
1964 establishments in Nepal